Dorangia Daku is a 1940 Bollywood film which was directed by Harnam Singh Rawail. This is the debut film of director Rawali.

Cast
 Sunder
 Baburao Pehalwan,

References

External links
 

1940 films
1940s Hindi-language films
Films directed by H. S. Rawail
Indian black-and-white films